The 2016 GFA Premier Division was the 33rd season of top-division football in Grenada. The regular season competition began on 10 June 2016 and concluded on 23 October 2016.

The playoffs were scheduled to begin in December 2016, with the first legs of the semifinals being held on 11 December 2016 and the second legs on 14 December 2016. The final and consolation matches were scheduled for 18 December 2016, but were not played. This was due to a double forfeit between Mount Rich and Paradise FC International as both their games were unplayed. By default, Hard Rock won the league title after beating St. John's Sports 4–0 on aggregate in their semifinal series. St. John's was the default runner-up.

Both St. John's and Hard Rock earned berths into the 2017 CFU Club Championship, but ended up not participating in the competition.

Teams
A total of 10 teams are taking part in the league. New Hampshire United and GBSS were relegated to the GFA First Division. The two clubs that replaced them were Mount Rich and Gouyave. Mount Rich is returned to the top flight for the first time since 2014, while Gouyave was making their inaugural campaign in the top division.

Regular Stage

Post-season

Championship Playoff

Relegation Playoff 

The 7th and 8th placed 2016 GFA Premier Division teams, Chantimelle and Fontenoy United, respectively played in a two-leg aggregate series against the third and fourth-place finishers of the 2016 GFA First Division, Eagles Super Strikers and North Stars, respectively.

Results 

Eagles Super Strikers won 2–1 on aggregate and were promoted to the GFA Premier Division.

Chantimelle won 9–1 on aggregate and remained in the GFA Premier Division.

References

External links 

2016
Grenada
Grenada
football